Alfreda Creek is a stream in Nipissing District of Northeastern Ontario, Canada. It is in the Ottawa River drainage basin and lies entirely within geographic Strathy Township which lies within the municipal boundaries of Temagami.

The creek has a characteristic U shape and begins at the south end of Alfreda Lake. It heads south for  where it takes in an unnamed right tributary then flows  southeastwards.

See also
List of rivers of Ontario

References

External links

Rivers of Temagami
Strathy Township